Großpostwitz (German) or Budestecy (Upper Sorbian) is a municipality in the east of Saxony, Germany. It belongs to Bautzen district and lies south of the town of Bautzen.

The municipality except Eulowitz is part of the recognized Sorbian settlement area in Saxony. Upper Sorbian has an official status next to German, all villages bear names in both languages.

Geography 
The municipality is situated at the northern edge of the Lausitzer Bergland (Lusatian Hills) along the Spree. The Bundesstraße 96 passes Großpostwitz.

Villages 
Several villages belong to the municipality:

Berge/Zahor
Binnewitz/Bónjecy
Cosul/Kózły
Ebendörfel/Bělšecy
Eulowitz/Jiłocy
Großpostwitz/Budestecy
Klein Kunitz/Chójnička
Mehltheuer/Lubjenc
Rascha/Rašow
Denkwitz/Dźenikecy

History
Within the German Empire (1871-1918), Großpostwitz was part of the Kingdom of Saxony.

References 

Populated places in Bautzen (district)